The men's 100 metre freestyle was a swimming event held as part of the swimming at the 1924 Summer Olympics programme. It was the sixth appearance of the event, which had not been featured at the 1900 Games. The competition was held on Saturday July 19, 1924 and on Sunday July 20, 1924. There were 30 competitors from 15 nations. Nations were limited to three swimmers each, down from four in 1920. The United States swept the medals for the second consecutive Games, winning its fourth consecutive gold medal. Johnny Weissmuller beat two-time defending champion Duke Kahanamoku in the final. Kahanamoku was the first man to win three medals in the event. His brother Samuel Kahanamoku earned the bronze medal.

Background

This was the sixth appearance of the men's 100 metre freestyle. The event has been held at every Summer Olympics except 1900 (when the shortest freestyle was the 200 metres), though the 1904 version was measured in yards rather than metres.

One of the five finalists from 1920 returned: two-time gold medalist Duke Kahanamoku of the United States. American Johnny Weissmuller, the world record holder in the event, was a heavy favorite in the event. His teammates, Duke and Samuel Kahanamoku, were also strong contenders.

Argentina, Spain, and Yugoslavia each made their debut in the event. The United States made its sixth appearance, having competed at each edition of the event to date.

Competition format

The competition used a three-round (quarterfinals, semifinals, final) format. The advancement rule was the one used since 1912; for each round before the final, the top two in each heat plus the fastest third-place swimmer would advance. There were 6 quarterfinals of between 4 and 6 swimmers, allowing 13 swimmers to advance to the semifinals. The 2 semifinals had 6 or 7 swimmers; 5 advanced to the final.

Each race involved two lengths of the 50-metre pool.

Records

These were the standing world and Olympic records (in minutes) prior to the 1924 Summer Olympics.

In the second semifinal Johnny Weissmuller set a new Olympic record with 1:00.8 minutes. In the final he bettered his record with a time of 59.0 seconds.

Schedule

Results

Heats

The fastest two in each heat and the fastest third-placed from across the heats advanced.

Heat 1

Heat 2

Heat 3

Heat 4

Heat 5

Heat 6

Semifinals

The fastest two in each semi-final and the faster of the two third-placed swimmer advanced to the final.

Semifinal 1

Semifinal 2

Final

Results summary

References

External links
Olympic Report
 

Swimming at the 1924 Summer Olympics
Men's events at the 1924 Summer Olympics